Michelle Cesan (born March 18, 1991, Harding Township, New Jersey) is an American field hockey player. At the 2012 Summer Olympics, she competed for the United States women's national field hockey team in the women's event.  She attended Princeton University and was named an NFHCA All-American for two seasons.

References

External links
 
 
 

1991 births
Living people
American female field hockey players
Pan American Games gold medalists for the United States
Pan American Games medalists in field hockey
Field hockey players at the 2011 Pan American Games
Sportspeople from Morris County, New Jersey
People from Harding Township, New Jersey
Medalists at the 2011 Pan American Games
21st-century American women